Luis Geovani Cardona Abrego (born February 5, 1990) is a Guatemalan football player who currently plays as a defender for C.D. Suchitepéquez.

Club career
In December 2016, it was announced that Cardona would be leaving Municipal for Suchitepéquez, having spent 3 years with the Guatemala City side.

International career
Cardona featured in Guatemala's 9-3 thrashing of Saint Vincent and the Grenadines in September 2016.

References

External links
 
 

1995 births
Living people
Guatemalan footballers
Guatemala international footballers
Antigua GFC players
C.S.D. Municipal players
C.D. Suchitepéquez players
Association football defenders